This is a list of some notable composers who wrote symphonic poems.

Mily Balakirev 
Russia (Second Overture on Russian Themes)
In Bohemia (Overture on Czech Themes)
Tamara

Béla Bartók 
Kossuth (1903)

Arnold Bax 
 Cathaleen-ni-Hoolihan (1905)
 Into the Twilight (1908)
 In the Faëry Hills (1909)
 Rosc-catha (1910)
 Christmas Eve (1912, r. 1921)
 Nympholept (1912, orch. 1915, r. 1935)
 The Garden of Fand (1913, orch. 1916)
 Spring Fire (1913)
 In Memoriam (1916)
 November Woods (1917)
 Tintagel (1917, orch. 1919)
 Summer Music (1917, orch. 1921, r. 1932)
 The Happy Forest (1922)
 The Tale the Pine Trees Knew (1931)
 Northern Ballad No. 1 (1927)
 Northern Ballad No. 2 (1934)
 Prelude for a Solemn Occasion (Northern Ballad No. 3) (1927, orch. 1933)
 A Legend (1944)

Hector Berlioz 
 Chasse royale et orage

Alexander Borodin 
 In the Steppes of Central Asia (actually 'Musical Picture'; 1880)

George Whitefield Chadwick 
 Symphonic Sketches

Ernest Chausson 
Viviane

Claude Debussy 
Prélude à l'après-midi d'un faune (Prelude to the Afternoon of a Faun)
La Mer (The Sea)

Frederick Delius 
 Hiawatha, VI/2 (1888)	
 Three Small Tone-poems, VI/7 (1890)
 Summer Evening
 Winter Night (or, Sleigh Ride)
 Spring Morning
 Paa Vidderne (On the Mountains), VI/10 (1890–92)	
 Over the Hills and Far Away, VI/11 (1895–97); fantasy overture for orchestra
 Paris: The Song of a Great City, VI/14 (1899–1900); nocturne for orchestra
 Two Pieces for Small Orchestra, VI/19 (1911–12)
 On Hearing the First Cuckoo in Spring
 Summer Night on the River
 Eventyr (Once Upon a Time), VI/23 (1917)
 A Song of Summer, VI/26 (1929–30)

Paul Dukas 
 L'apprenti sorcier (The Sorcerer's Apprentice), symphonic scherzo after Goethe (1896–97)

Antonín Dvořák 
 Symphonic Poem, in A minor, Op. 14 (1874)
 Vodník (The Water Goblin), Op. 107 (1896)
 Polednice (The Noon Witch), Op. 108 (1896)
 Zlatý kolovrat (The Golden Spinning Wheel), Op. 109 (1896)
 Holoubek (The Wild Dove), Op. 110 (1896; r. 1897)
 Píseň bohatýrská (A Hero's Song), Op. 111 (1897)

Edward Elgar 
Cockaigne (In London Town)
In the South

George Enescu 
 Vox maris

Lorenzo Ferrero 
La Nueva España, a set of six symphonic poems (1992–99)

Zdeněk Fibich 
 Othello, Op. 6
 Spring, Op 13
 Záboj, Slavoj a Luděk, Op. 37
 The Tempest, Op. 46
 Toman and the Wood Nymph, Op. 49

César Franck 
Ce qu'on entend sur la montagne, symphonic poem after Victor Hugo, (1845–87, posth.)
Rédemption, for soprano, chorus and orchestra, M. 52 (1872, r. 1874)
Les Éolides, M. 43 (1876)
Le Chasseur maudit (The Accursed Huntsman), M. 44 (1882)
Les Djinns, for piano and orchestra, M. 45 (1884)
Psyché, for orchestra and chorus, M. 47 (1886–88)

George Gershwin 
 An American in Paris (actually 'Tone Poem'; 1928)
 Cuban Overture

Alexander Glazunov 
 Stenka Razin

Geoffrey Gordon 
 Shock Diamonds

Ferde Grofé 
 Knute Rockne
 Trylon and Perisphere
 Atlantic Crossing

Percy Grainger 
 Train Music

Karl Amadeus Hartmann 
 Miserae (1933–34, previously titled Symphony No. 1)

Lee Holdridge 
Scenes of Summer (September/October 1973)

Gustav Holst 
 Egdon Heath

Arthur Honegger 
 Pacific 231

John Ireland 
 The Forgotten Rite (1913, published 1918)

Mieczysław Karłowicz 
Returning Waves, Op. 9 (1904)
Eternal Songs, Op. 10 (1906)
Lithuanian Rhapsody, Op. 11 (1906)
Stanisław i Anna Oświecimowie, Op. 12 (1906)
A Sorrowful Tale, Op. 13 (1907–1908)
An Episode during Masquerade, Op. 14 (1908–09)

Franz Liszt 
 Liszt's symphonic poems:
 Ce qu'on entend sur la montagne (1848–9) (after Victor Hugo)
 Tasso: lamento e trionfo (1849) (after Byron)
 Les Préludes, after Lamartine (1848, rev. before 1854)
 Orpheus (1853–4)
 Prometheus (1850)
 Mazeppa (1851)
 Festklänge (1853)
 Héroïde funèbre (1849–50)
 Hungaria (1854)
 Hamlet (1858)
 Hunnenschlacht (1857)
 Die Ideale (1857) (after Schiller)
 Von der Wiege bis zum Grabe (1881–2)

William Lloyd Webber 
 Aurora

Leevi Madetoja 
 Kullervo, Op. 15 (1913)
 Sammon ryöstö (The Abduction of The Sampo), for baritone and male choir, Op. 24 (1915); text from the Kalevala
 Aslak Smaukka, for baritone and male choir, Op. 37 (1917)
 Väinämöisen kylvö (Väinämöinen Sows the Wilderness), for soprano (or tenor), Op. 46 (1919–20); text from the Kalevala

Frederik Magle 
 Cantabile suite – 3 symphonic poems (2004–09)

Richard Mohaupt 
 Town Piper Music (Stadtpfeifermusik) (1941)

Modest Mussorgsky 
 Night on the Bare Mountain

Carl Nielsen 
 Saga-Drøm (Saga Dream), Op. 39 (1908)
 Pan og Syrinx (Pan and Syrinx), Op. 49 (1918)

Sergei Rachmaninoff 
Prince Rostislav (1891)
The Rock, Op. 7 (1893)
Caprice bohémien, Op. 12 (1892–94)
 Isle of the Dead, Op. 29 (1908)

Osmo Tapio Räihälä 
Ardbeg (2003)
Barlinnie Nine (2005)
Rautasade (Iron Rain) (2008)

Max Reger 
 Vier Tondichtungen nach A. Böcklin (Four Tone Poems after Arnold Böcklin) for orchestra, Op. 128 (1913)

Cemal Reşit Rey 
 Bebek Efsanesi, symphonic poem for orchestra
 Karagöz
 Denizciler Marşı Başlayış
 Çağrılış
 Fatih

Ottorino Respighi 
Fontane di Roma (Fountains of Rome), P 106 (1916); part I of Respighi's Roman Trilogy
 Ballata delle gnomidi (Ballad of the Gnomes), P 124 (1919)
 Pini di Roma (Pines of Rome), P 141 (1924); part II of Respighi's Roman Trilogy
 Feste Romane (Roman Festivals), P 157 (1928); part III of Respighi's Roman Trilogy

Silvestre Revueltas 
 Sensemayá

Nikolai Rimsky-Korsakov 
 Night on Mount Triglav
 Sadko (Symphonic Picture)

Camille Saint-Saëns 
Spartacus (1863)
Le Rouet d'Omphale, op.31 (1869)
Phaéton, op. 39 (1873)
Danse macabre, Op.40 (1874)
La Jeunesse d'Hercule, Op.50 (1877)
La Muse et le Poète, Op.132 (1910)

Arnold Schoenberg 
Verklärte Nacht, Op.4
Pelleas und Melisande, Op.5

Alexander Scriabin 
 Symphonic Poem, in D minor (1896)
The Poem of Ecstasy, Op. 54 (1905–08); often listed as Symphony No. 4
Prometheus: The Poem of Fire, Op. 60 (1910); often listed as Symphony No. 5

Dmitri Shostakovich 
The Execution of Stepan Razin, Op. 119 (1964)
October, Op. 131 (1967)

Jean Sibelius 
One of the most prolific (and significant) contributors to the genre; compositions marked with an asterisk were inspired by Finnish mythology:
 En saga (A Saga or A Fairy Tale), Op. 9 (1892, r. 1902)
 Vårsång (Spring Song), Op. 16 (1894, r. 1895 and 1902)
 Skogsrået (The Wood Nymph), Op. 15 (1894–95)
 Lemminkäinen Suite (also known as Four Legends from the Kalevala), a cycle of four symphonic poems, Op. 22 (1895) *
 Lemminkäinen ja saaren neidot (Lemminkäinen and the Maidens of the Island) (1895, r. 1897 and 1939)  *
 Tuonelan joutsen (The Swan of Tuonela) (1893-1895, r. 1897 and 1900) *
 Lemminkäinen Tuonelassa (Lemminkäinen in Tuonela) (1895, r. 1897 and 1939) *
 Lemminkäinen palaa kotitienoille (Lemminkäinen's Return) (1895, r. 1897 and 1900) *
 Finlandia, Op. 26 (1899, r. 1900); arranged from Press Celebrations Music, JS 137
 Pohjolan tytär (Pohjola's Daughter), Op. 49 (1906) *
 Pan och Echo (Pan and Echo), Op. 53a (1906)
 Öinen ratsastus ja auringonnousu (Nightride and Sunrise), Op. 55 (1909)
 Dryadi (The Dryad), Op. 45/1 (1910)
 Luonnotar (Spirit of Nature), for soprano and orchestra, Op. 70 (1913); text from the Kalevala *
 Barden (The Bard), Op. 64 (1913, r. 1914)
 Aallottaret (The Oceanides), Op. 73 (1913–14, r. 1914)
 Tapiola, Op. 112 (1926) *

Bedřich Smetana 
 Richard III, Op. 11/JB 1:70 (1857–58)
 Valdštýnův tábor (Wallenstein's Camp), Op. 14/JB 1:72 (1858–59)
 Hakon Jarl, Op. 16/JB 1:79 (1860–61)
 Má vlast (My Homeland), JB 1:112 (1874–79); a cycle of six symphonic poems
 Vyšehrad (The High Castle)
 Vltava (The Moldau)
 Šárka 
 Z českých luhů a hájů (From Bohemia's Woods and Fields)
 Tábor
 Blaník

William Grant Still 
 Darker America (1924)
 Africa (1930)
 Kaintuck (1935)

Richard Strauss 
One of the most prolific (and important) contributors to the genre. He preferred the term "tone poem," rather than "symphonic poem."
 Aus Italien (From Italy), Op. 16 (1886)
 Don Juan, Op. 20 (1888)
 Macbeth, Op. 23 (1886–88)
 Tod und Verklärung (Death and Transfiguration), Op. 24 (1889)
 Till Eulenspiegels lustige Streiche (Till Eulenspiegel's Merry Pranks), Op. 28 (1894–95)
 Also sprach Zarathustra (Thus Spoke Zarathustra), Op. 30 (1896)
 Don Quixote, Op. 35 (1897)
 Ein Heldenleben (A Hero's Life), Op. 40 (1898)
 Symphonia Domestica, Op. 53 (1903)
 Eine Alpensinfonie (An Alpine Symphony), Op. 64 (1915)

Josef Suk 
Pohádka Léta, Op.29 (A Summer's Tale)
 Praga
 The Ripening
 Cycle of Symphonic Poems from Czech History

Igor Stravinsky 
Le chant du rossignol

Sergei Taneyev 
 Oresteia (labeled as an "overture", but really a symphonic poem based on themes from his opera of the same name)

Pyotr Ilyich Tchaikovsky 
 The Storm, Op. (posth.) 76 (1864)
 Fatum, Op. 77 (1868)
 Romeo and Juliet, overture-fantasy after Shakespeare, TH 42 (1869–70, r. 1880)
 Francesca da Rimini, symphonic fantasia after Dante, Op. 32 (1876)
 The Tempest, symphonic fantasia after Shakespeare, Op. 18 (1873)
 Marche slave, Op. 31 (1876)
 Hamlet, overture-fantasy, Op. 67a (1889)
 The Voyevoda, Op. (posth.) 78 (1891)

Geirr Tveitt 
 Nykken

Johan Wagenaar 
Saul en David

Richard Wagner 
Siegfried Idyll

Anton Webern 
Im Sommerwind (actually 'Idyll after B. Wille', 1904)

Eric Whitacre 
Godzilla Eats Las Vegas (for winds, 1996)

Haydn Wood 
Mannin Veen: Dear Isle of Man (1933)

Alexander von Zemlinsky 
Die Seejungfrau (The Little Mermaid), fantasy after Hans Christian Andersen (1902–03)

Airat Ichmouratov 
 David of Sassoun, symphonic poem after Armenian epos, Op. 11 (2006)
 The Letter from an Unknown Woman, for Strings, Op. 56 (2017)

See also
List of program music

References

 
Symphonic poems
Symphonic poems